Massamba Ndiaye (born 8 October 2001) is a Senegalese professional footballer who plays as a goalkeeper for Pau FC.

Career 
Ndiaye signed with Pau FC in 2021 from his native CNEPS Excellence. He extended his professional contract with Pau on 25 May 2022 for three years, keeping him at the club until June 2025.

He made his professional debut for Pau in a 1–1 Ligue 2 tie with SC Bastia on 5 February 2022.

References

External links 
 
 
 

Pau FC players
2001 births
Living people
Senegalese footballers
Ligue 2 players
Expatriate footballers in France
Senegalese expatriate sportspeople in France